Clint Charles N'Dumba Capela (born May 18, 1994) is a Swiss professional basketball player for the Atlanta Hawks of the National Basketball Association (NBA). He is the highest-earning team athlete in Switzerland's history.

Early years
Capela was born in Geneva, Switzerland, to an Angolan father and Congolese mother. His parents separated a few months after his birth, leaving his mother to raise him and his brothers by herself. As a child, at first he liked soccer. He was raised partly in foster care. After meeting Swiss basketball icon Thabo Sefolosha, Capela became more and more fascinated with basketball. At 15 years old, he was spotted at the European Junior Championships with the Swiss team and joined the Chalon-sur-Saône training center, INSEP, in France.

Professional career

Élan Chalon (2012–2014)
In 2012, Capela joined the senior Élan Chalon team of the LNB Pro A.

On April 12, 2014, Capela represented the World Team at the 2014 Nike Hoop Summit. Later that month, he declared for the 2014 NBA draft. In May 2014, he was named the Best Young Player and Most Improved Player of the 2013–14 LNB Pro A season.

Houston Rockets (2014–2020)
On June 26, 2014, Capela was selected with the 25th overall pick in the 2014 NBA draft by the Houston Rockets. On July 25, 2014, he signed with the Rockets. On March 30, 2015, Capela scored his first NBA points, finishing the game with eight points and nine rebounds in a 99–96 loss to the Toronto Raptors. On April 13, he had a season-best game for the Rockets with 10 points and five rebounds in a win over the Charlotte Hornets. During his rookie season, he had multiple assignments with the Rio Grande Valley Vipers of the NBA Development League. Capela took a step forward in the postseason, when he saw minutes in place of the injured Donatas Motiejūnas. He appeared in more playoff games (17) than regular season contests in 2014–15 and averaged 3.4 points in 7.5 minutes per postseason game.

In his second season, on November 6, 2015, Capela recorded his first career double-double with then career highs of 13 points and 12 rebounds as a starter in a 116–110 win over the Sacramento Kings. On November 29, in an overtime win over the New York Knicks, Capela recorded his third double-double over a span of four games, including a career-high 18 points. During the 2016 NBA All-Star Weekend, Capela competed for the World Team in the Rising Stars Challenge. On April 13, in the Rockets' season finale, Capela recorded a career-high 17 rebounds in a 116–81 win over Sacramento.

On November 19, 2016, Capela scored a career-high 20 points in a 111–102 win over the Utah Jazz. On November 27, 2016, he set a new career high with 21 points against the Portland Trail Blazers. On December 19, 2016, he was ruled out for six weeks after suffering a broken fibula. He returned to action on January 17, 2017, against the Miami Heat after missing 15 games; he started the game against Miami but was scoreless in nine minutes.

On October 18, 2017, Capela had 22 points and matched his career high with 17 rebounds in a 105–100 win over the Sacramento Kings. On December 11, 2017, he had a career-high 28 points in a 130–123 win over the New Orleans Pelicans. By Christmas, Capela had accumulated 16 double-doubles in 28 games and ranked first in the NBA in field goal percentage. On February 9, 2018, he recorded 23 points and a career-high 25 rebounds in a 130–104 win over the Denver Nuggets, earning his first 20-point, 20-rebound game of his career. He became the youngest Rocket to have at least 23 points and 25 rebounds in a game since Hakeem Olajuwon had 30 points and 25 rebounds against the Knicks on February 14, 1985. Capela was runner-up for the NBA Most Improved Player Award in 2017–18 after averaging career highs of 13.9 points, 10.8 rebounds, and 1.85 blocks. He led the league in field goal percentage (.652) while ranking eighth in rebounding and second in blocks. In Game 5 of the Rockets' first-round playoff series against the Minnesota Timberwolves, Capela had 26 points and 15 rebounds in a 122–104 series-clinching win.

After the 2017–18 season, Capela became a restricted free agent. On July 27, 2018, he signed a five-year, $90 million extension with the Rockets. On November 5, in a 98–94 win over the Indiana Pacers, Capela had 18 points and 10 rebounds for his sixth consecutive double-double, a career best. On December 22, he had 21 points and a season-high 23 rebounds in a 108–101 win over the San Antonio Spurs. On December 25, he had 16 points and tied a season high with 23 rebounds in a 113–109 win over the Oklahoma City Thunder. On January 7, he scored a career-high 31 points in a 125–113 win over the Denver Nuggets. On January 14, he was ruled out for four to six weeks with a right thumb injury that he suffered the previous night against the Orlando Magic. He returned to action on February 21 against the Los Angeles Lakers after missing 15 games. In March 2019, he had a career-best streak (12) of games with at least 10 rebounds.

Atlanta Hawks (2020–present)
On February 5, 2020, Houston traded Capela and Nenê to the Atlanta Hawks and received Robert Covington and Jordan Bell in a four-team, 12-player trade.

On December 28, 2020, Capela made his Hawks debut, putting up seven points, nine rebounds, and two blocks in a 128–120 win against the Detroit Pistons. On January 22, 2021, Capela recorded his first career triple-double with 13 points, 19 rebounds, and 10 blocks in a 116–98 win over the Minnesota Timberwolves. During the 2021 NBA Playoffs, Capela helped the Hawks reach the Conference Finals. On June 23, Capela scored 12 points, including the go-ahead score with 29.8 seconds left, and grabbed 19 rebounds during a 116–113 Game 1 win over the Milwaukee Bucks. The Hawks would eventually lose the series in six games.

On December 31, 2021, Capela grabbed a season-high 23 rebounds and scored 18 points during a 121–118 win over the Cleveland Cavaliers.

National team career
In August 2013, Capela debuted for the Swiss national basketball team at the FIBA EuroBasket 2015 qualification rounds.

Career statistics

NBA

Regular season

|-
| style="text-align:left;"|
| style="text-align:left;"|Houston
| 12 || 0 || 7.5 || .483 ||  || .174 || 3.0 || .2 || .1 || .8 || 2.7
|-
| style="text-align:left;"|
| style="text-align:left;"|Houston
| 77 || 35 || 19.1 || .582 || .000 || .379 || 6.4 || .6 || .8 || 1.2 || 7.0
|-
| style="text-align:left;"|
| style="text-align:left;"|Houston
| 57 || 51 || 23.6 || .643 ||  || .531 || 8.1 || 1.0 || .5 || 1.2 || 12.6
|-
| style="text-align:left;"|
| style="text-align:left;"|Houston
| 74 || 74 || 27.5 || style="background:#cfecec;"|.652* || .000 || .560 || 10.8 || .9 || .8 || 1.9 || 13.9
|-
| style="text-align:left;"|
| style="text-align:left;"|Houston
| 67 || 67 || 33.6 || .648 ||  || .636 || 12.7 || 1.4 || .7 || 1.5 || 16.6
|-
| style="text-align:left;"|
| style="text-align:left;"|Houston
| 39 || 39 || 32.8 || .629 ||  || .529 || 13.8 || 1.2 || .8 || 1.8 || 13.9
|-
| style="text-align:left;"|
| style="text-align:left;"|Atlanta
| 63 || 63 || 30.1 || .594 ||  || .573 || style="background:#cfecec;"| 14.3* || .8 || .7 || 2.0 || 15.2
|-
| style="text-align:left;"|
| style="text-align:left;"|Atlanta
| 74 || 73 || 27.6 || .613 || .000 || .473 || 11.9 || 1.2 || .7 || 1.3 || 11.1
|- class="sortbottom"
| style="text-align:center;" colspan="2"|Career
| 471 || 410 || 26.8 || .624 || .000 || .527 || 10.7 || 1.0 || .7 || 1.5 || 12.4

Playoffs

|-
| style="text-align:left;"|2015
| style="text-align:left;"|Houston
| 17 || 0 || 7.5 || .677 ||  || .517 || 2.5 || .3 || .2 || .5 || 3.4
|-
| style="text-align:left;"|2016
| style="text-align:left;"|Houston
| 5 || 0 || 8.6 || .333 ||  || .400 || 4.0 || .4 || .6 || .4 || 1.6
|-
| style="text-align:left;"|2017
| style="text-align:left;"|Houston
| 11 || 11 || 26.0 || .561 || .000 || .615 || 8.7 || 1.1 || .7 || 2.5 || 10.5
|-
| style="text-align:left;"|2018
| style="text-align:left;"|Houston
| 17 || 17 || 30.6 || .660 ||  || .473 || 11.6 || 1.3 || .8 || 2.1 || 12.7
|-
| style="text-align:left;"|2019
| style="text-align:left;"|Houston
| 11 || 11 || 30.1 || .561 ||  || .429 || 10.3 || 1.5 || .3 || 1.1 || 9.7
|-
| style="text-align:left;"|2021
| style="text-align:left;"|Atlanta
| 18 || 18 || 31.6 || .603 ||  || .436 || 11.2 || .9 || .7 || 1.1 || 10.1
|-
| style="text-align:left;"|2022
| style="text-align:left;"|Atlanta
| 2 || 2 || 20.0 || .333 ||  ||  || 7.5 || .0 || .5 || .5 || 2.0
|- class="sortbottom"
| style="text-align:center;" colspan="2"|Career
| 81 || 59 || 23.7 || .602 || .000 || .490 || 8.4 || .9 || .5 || 1.3 || 8.5

EuroLeague

|-
| style="text-align:left;"|2012–13
| style="text-align:left;"|Élan Chalon
| 7 || 0 || 8.0 || .636 || .000 || 1.000 || 3.0 || .3 || .4 || .7 || 2.3 || 4.9
|- class="sortbottom"
| style="text-align:center;" colspan="2"|Career
| 7 || 0 || 8.0 || .636 || .000 || 1.000 || 3.0 || .3 || .4 || .7 || 2.3 || 4.9

References

External links

 Clint Capela at euroleague.net

1994 births
Living people
Atlanta Hawks players
Élan Chalon players
Houston Rockets draft picks
Houston Rockets players
National Basketball Association players from Switzerland
Power forwards (basketball)
Rio Grande Valley Vipers players
Sportspeople from Geneva
Swiss expatriate basketball people in the United States
Swiss men's basketball players
Swiss people of Angolan descent
Swiss sportspeople of African descent
Swiss people of Republic of the Congo descent